John M. Levis (born May 7, 1956) is an American academic and Angela B. Pavitt Professor in English at Iowa State University.

Levis earned his master's and doctoral degrees from University of Illinois at Urbana–Champaign. He founded the Pronunciation in Second Language Learning and Teaching Conference and the associated PSLLT Proceedings in 2008, followed by The Journal of Second Language Pronunciation, first published in 2015.

References

Living people
University of Illinois Urbana-Champaign alumni
Iowa State University faculty
Academic journal editors
1956 births